Musa Amer Obaid (born April 18, 1985, in Kenya) is a middle distance runner mainly competing in steeplechase. He was born Moses Kipkirui, but represents Qatar after changing nationality from his birth country Kenya.

Musa Amer finished fourth in the 3000 metres steeplechase at the 2004 Summer Olympics in a personal best time of 8:07.18 minutes, having won the silver medal at the World Junior Championships a month earlier. In 2005 he finished ninth at the World Championships and seventh at the World Athletics Final.
 
In 2006 Musa Amer was found guilty of testosterone doping. The sample was delivered on 14 June 2006 in an IAAF out-of-competition test in Ifrane, Morocco. He received an IAAF suspension from September 2006 to September 2008.

See also
List of doping cases in athletics

References

External links

1985 births
Living people
Qatari male middle-distance runners
Kenyan male middle-distance runners
Kenyan male steeplechase runners
Qatari male steeplechase runners
Olympic athletes of Qatar
Athletes (track and field) at the 2004 Summer Olympics
World Athletics Championships athletes for Qatar
Kenyan emigrants to Qatar
Naturalised citizens of Qatar
Kenyan sportspeople in doping cases
Qatari sportspeople in doping cases
Doping cases in athletics
Qatari people of Kenyan descent